Laelia rosea is a species of moth of the family Erebidae. It was described by William Schaus and W. G. Clements in 1893 and is found in Sierra Leone.

References

Lymantriinae
Moths of Africa
Moths described in 1893